Antoine Alexandre Brutus Bussy (29 May 1794 – 1 February 1882) was a French chemist who primarily studied pharmaceuticals.

Education 
Antoine Bussy entered the École Polytechnique in 1813, and there followed the courses delivered by Pierre Robiquet, the great French chemist who was to make decisive breakthroughs in bio-chemistry (he isolated the first amino-acid ever identified, asparagin, in 1805–1806), in industrial dyes (he isolated and identified alizarin, the most famous and first modern industrial red dye) and the pick-up of modern medication (he isolated, identified and started mass production of codeine, 1832). Robiquet tutored Antoine Bussy in his career as a chemist researcher and in his private career as pharmacist as well. In 1831 Antoine Bussy  published the 'Mémoire sur le Radical métallique de la Magnésie' where he described a method of preparing magnesium by heating magnesium chloride and potassium in a glass tube.  When the potassium chloride was washed out, small globules of magnesium remained.

References 

19th-century French chemists
1794 births
1882 deaths
École Polytechnique alumni
Members of the French Academy of Sciences